Pseudochromis reticulatus, the reticulate dottyback, is a species of marine ray-finned fish, a dottyback belonging to the family Pseudochromidae. It is endemic to the waters off northwestern Australia.

References

reticulatus
Fish described in 1992
Taxa named by David J. Woodland